Agua de Sevilla is a drink typically consumed mostly in the region of Seville, Spain. It is considered "a mild and tasty typical drink" and can be found in numerous nightclubs in Seville.

Preparation 
Agua de Sevilla's preparation varies widely, but a fairly typical recipe is:
 1 liter pineapple juice or syrup
 1 bottle of cava, sparkling, wine located in Spain (around .75 liters)
 1 cup whiskey
 1 cup cointreau (triplesec)
 ice

Optional:
 heavy cream

Some recipes call for an additional cup of rum, and others substitute cognac for cointreau. Some also call for shaved ice.

Recipes instruct to crush the ice until it is shaved and serve in champagne glasses with a leaf of hierba buena.

See also
 
 List of cocktails
 List of cocktails (alphabetical)

References

cócteles

Cocktails with wine